The 2002 San Diego Padres season was the 34th season in franchise history.

Offseason
December 27, 2001: Alan Embree was signed as a free agent with the San Diego Padres.
 February 24, 2002: Trenidad Hubbard was signed as a free agent with the San Diego Padres.
March 16, 2002: Mark Sweeney was signed as a free agent with the San Diego Padres.

Regular season

Opening Day starters
 D'Angelo Jiménez – 2B
 Mark Kotsay – CF
 Ron Gant – LF
 Phil Nevin – 1B
 Bubba Trammell – RF
 Deivi Cruz – SS
 Wiki González – C
 Ramon Vazquez – 3B
 Kevin Jarvis – SP

Season standings

National League West

Record vs. opponents

Notable transactions
June 26, 2002: Alan Embree was traded by the San Diego Padres with Andy Shibilo (minors) to the Boston Red Sox for Dan Giese and Brad Baker (minors).
July 15, 2002: Mark Sweeney was released by the San Diego Padres.
July 31, 2002: Jason Bay was traded by the New York Mets with Josh Reynolds (minors) and Bobby Jones to the San Diego Padres for Steve Reed and Jason Middlebrook.
August 13, 2002: Mark Sweeney was signed as a free agent with the San Diego Padres.
August 16, 2002: Mark Sweeney was released by the San Diego Padres.
September 4, 2002: Trenidad Hubbard was released by the San Diego Padres.

Roster

Player stats

Batting

Starters by position 
Note: Pos = Position; G = Games played; AB = At bats; H = Hits; Avg. = Batting average; HR = Home runs; RBI = Runs batted in

Other batters 
Note: G = Games played; AB = At bats; H = Hits; Avg. = Batting average; HR = Home runs; RBI = Runs batted in

Pitching

Starting pitchers 
Note: G = Games pitched; IP = Innings pitched; W = Wins; L = Losses; ERA = Earned run average; SO = Strikeouts

Other pitchers 
Note: G = Games pitched; IP = Innings pitched; W = Wins; L = Losses; ERA = Earned run average; SO = Strikeouts

Relief pitchers 
Note: G = Games pitched; W = Wins; L = Losses; SV = Saves; ERA = Earned run average; SO = Strikeouts

Award winners

2002 Major League Baseball All-Star Game
 Trevor Hoffman

Farm system

References

External links
 2002 San Diego Padres at Baseball Reference
 2002 San Diego Padres at Baseball Almanac

San Diego Padres seasons
San Diego Padres season
San Diego